Farmington is a city in Oakland County in the U.S. state of Michigan. It is a northern suburb of Metro Detroit. As of the 2010 census, the population was 10,372.

It is surrounded by Farmington Hills, except for a small portion bordered by Livonia to the south. Since 2009, the city's downtown has been the center of an extensive renovation and remodeling featuring a refacing or rebuilding of many buildings on Grand River Avenue, as well as brick paver sidewalks, the Farmington Pavilion, new lighting, and landscaping. The area is known for its historic downtown, elegant Victorian-style homes, and one of Michigan's top rated public school systems, Farmington Public Schools. In 2007 CNNMoney.com listed Farmington as number 55 in its Best Places to Live survey. Farmington was also ranked 27th on the list for Best to Live in 2013, citing nearly US$3 million in additional city renovations and development, bumping its rank up.

History
Farmington was the site of three Native American trails - the Orchard Lake Trail, the Grand River Trail, and the Shiawassee Trail.

Farmington was founded in 1824 by Arthur Power. Like many Oakland County pioneers, he hailed from the state of New York. Power was a Quaker, as were the settlers who joined him, and the town was first known as Quakertown. In 1826 the name Farmington was officially chosen because it was the name of Power's hometown, Farmington, New York.

The name Farmington, which properly refers to the  municipality incorporated in the early 19th century, is sometimes erroneously used to refer to the  neighboring city of Farmington Hills (Farmington Township until 1973), which surrounds it.

In 1976 the National Register of Historic Places declared part of the city the Farmington Historic District.

Geography

Demographics

2010 census
As of the census of 2010, there were 10,372 people, 4,624 households, and 2,735 families residing in the city. The racial makeup of the city was 71.5% White, 11.4% African American, 0.4% Native American, 13.9% Asian, 0.1% Pacific Islander, 0.4% from other races, and 2.1% from two or more races. Hispanic or Latino of any race were 2.1% of the population.

There were 4,624 households, of which 28.0% had children under the age of 18 living with them, 45.9% were married couples living together, 10.4% had a female householder with no husband present, and 40.9% were non-families. 35.9% of all households were made up of individuals, and 13.7% had someone living alone who was 65 years of age or older. The average household size was 2.22 persons, and the average family size was 2.92.

In the city, the population was spread out, with 22.0% under the age of 18, 6.1% from 18 to 24, 29.4% from 25 to 44, 26.9% from 45 to 64, and 15.6% who were 65 years of age or older. The median age was 39.5 years. For every 100 females, there were 89.4 males. For every 100 females age 18 and over, there were 87.1 males.

The median income for a household in the city was $56,442, and the median income for a family was $67,407. Males had a median income of $54,780 versus $39,435 for females (2000 Census). The per capita income for the city was $36,281. About 2.6% of families and 4.4% of the population were below the poverty line, including 5.5% of those under age 18 and 7.6% of those age 65 or over.

Government
Farmington utilizes the council-manager form of government, and thus is governed by a city council consisting of a mayor and four council members. The city council appoints a city manager who manages the day-to-day operations of the city.

Farmington is surrounded by the city of Farmington Hills. The cities combine to form a district represented in Michigan's state government.  Farmington is part of the 6th Senate district and part of the 18th House of Representatives district.

The Mayor of Farmington is Sara Bowman. Bowman was elected, by the council, to this position in November 2019.

Education

Farmington is served by the Farmington Public Schools. Farmington High School is one of the two high schools in the district. The other high school is North Farmington High School. There was another high school, Harrison High School, but it closed in 2019 and will be used as a community center. There are three middle schools, East Middle School, Power Middle School, named after Arthur Power, and Warner Middle School, after the 26th Michigan governor Fred M. Warner.

There are also parochial and private schools in the community. Our Lady of Sorrows School, established in 1935, is in Farmington.

Notable sites 

The former Farmington Winery building is located on Grand River Avenue just west of Orchard Lake Road and houses the "Haunted Winery" during the Halloween season.

Media 
In addition to The Detroit News and the Detroit Free Press, regional newspapers serving all of southeast Michigan, the city is served by two community newspapers. The Farmington Observer is published twice a week, on Sunday and Thursday. The Farmington Press is published weekly. The Oakland Press covers all of Oakland County.

Recognition
In 2007, CNNMoney.com listed Farmington as number 55 in their Best Places to Live survey.
Best Places to Live: Top 100 - Farmington, Mich. (55) - Money Magazine

Notable people
Rex Cawley, gold medalist in the 1964 Tokyo Olympics
Michael Fougere, mayor of Regina, Saskatchewan
Devin Funchess, wide-receiver for the Carolina Panthers
Mickey Harris, baseball pitcher
Bob Johnson, ice hockey goaltender
Brent Johnson, ice hockey player of the Pittsburgh Penguins
Khalid Kareem, defensive end for Cincinnati Bengals
Robert Patrick, Hollywood actor
Drew Stanton, former NFL quarterback
Mike Vellucci, head coach of Charlotte Checkers

See also

 Farmington Community Library

References

Specific

General

External links
City of Farmington official website
Downtown Farmington

 
Cities in Oakland County, Michigan
Metro Detroit
Populated places established in 1826
1826 establishments in Michigan Territory